Lost in the Legion is a 1934 British comedy film directed by Fred Newmeyer and starring Leslie Fuller, Hal Gordon and Renée Houston.

Plot
A pair of ship's cooks become stranded ashore, and end up joining the French Foreign Legion.

Cast
 Leslie Fuller as Bill
 Hal Gordon as Alf
 Renée Houston as Mary McFee
 Betty Fields as Sally Hogg
 H. F. Maltby as Kaid
 Alf Goddard as Sergeant Mulligan
 A. Bromley Davenport as Colonel
 Mike Johnson as Fritz
 James Knight as Ryan

References

External links

1934 films
1934 comedy films
Films shot at British International Pictures Studios
Films about the French Foreign Legion
British black-and-white films
British comedy films
Films with screenplays by John Paddy Carstairs
1930s English-language films
Films directed by Fred C. Newmeyer
1930s British films